Women's Kabaddi Challenge is a Kabaddi league in India started like Pro Kabaddi League for women. Three teams will take part in inaugural season in 2016 and the league will be played across seven cities in India.

Season 1
The first season was played in 2016, from 28 June to 31 July and was broadcast by Star Sports in India. The final was scheduled along with men's version on 31 July.

Final was conducted between Storm Queen and Fire Birds. Storm Queens produced a last second turnaround to defeat Fire Birds 24-23 in the final.

Venues and Teams
Three teams will take part in first season
 Fire Birds - Captain: Mamatha Poojari
 Ice Divas - Captain: Abhilasha Mhatre
 Storm Queens - Captain: Tejaswini Bai

There will be seven venues for first edition Bangalore, Delhi, Hyderabad, Jaipur, Kolkata, Mumbai and Pune

References
 Women's Kabaddi challenge set to debut alongside men's Pro Kabaddi
 Star India launches Women's Kabaddi Challenge
 Women's Kabaddi challenge set to debut alongside men's Pro Kabaddi

Professional sports leagues in India
Sport in India
Kabaddi competitions
Kabaddi in India